The women's 200 metres event  at the 1995 IAAF World Indoor Championships was held on 10 March.

Medalists

Results

Heats
First 2 of each heat (Q) and next 4 fastest (q) qualified for the semifinals.

Semifinals
First 3 of each semifinal qualified directly (Q) for the final.

Final

References

200
200 metres at the IAAF World Indoor Championships
1995 in women's athletics